Gillian Cookson FRHS is a historian of the University of Leeds.

Cookson is a specialist in economic history, the 18th and 19th-century industrial history of Northern England, the history of mechanical engineering and textiles, industrial communities and business networks and landscape history. She is president of the Yorkshire Archaeological and Historical Society.

Selected publications
 The Age of Machinery: Engineering the Industrial Revolution (Boydell, 2018)
 Victoria County History of County Durham, V, Sunderland (Boydell and Brewer, 2015)
 Victoria County History of County Durham, IV, Darlington (Boydell and Brewer, 2005)
 The Townscape of Darlington (VCH Studies series: Boydell Press, 2003)
 The Cable: the Wire that Changed the World (Tempus Publishing, 2003; new edition by The History Press, 2012)
 A Victorian Scientist and Engineer: Fleeming Jenkin and the Birth of Electrical Engineering (with C.A. Hempstead: Ashgate, 2000)
 Sunderland: Building a City  (VCH Studies series: Phillimore, 2010)

References 

Alumni of the University of York
English architectural historians
British women academics
Fellows of the Royal Historical Society
English local historians
Living people
Women art historians
British women historians
Year of birth missing (living people)